Herblay-sur-Seine (literally Herblay on Seine; before 2018: Herblay) is a commune in the department of Val-d'Oise, France. It is twinned with Yeovil, UK.

Geography

Climate

Herblay-sur-Seine has a oceanic climate (Köppen climate classification Cfb).

Population

Transport
Herblay-sur-Seine is served by Herblay station on the Transilien Paris-Saint-Lazare suburban rail line.

Education
Schools in Herblay-sur-Seine:
 Six primary school : Jean-Louis Etienne, Jean Moulin, Buttes Blanches, Chênes, Tournade, Saint-Exupéry
 Seven public preschools (maternelles): Jean Moulin, Buttes Blanches, Chênes, Tournade, Saint-Exupéry, Louis Pergaud, Jean Jaurès  
 Seven public elementary schools: Jean Moulin, Pasteur, Buttes Blanches, Chênes, Saint Exupéry, Marie Curie, Jean Jaurès
 Two public junior high schools (collèges): Georges Duhamel and Jean Vilar
 Lycée Montesquieu (public senior high school/sixth-form college)
 Three private schools: Sainte Jeanne d'Arc, Montaigne, Léonard de Vinci

The commune has a municipal library.

People from Herblay
See :Category:People from Herblay

 Pierre Pincemaille (1956-2018), musician and organist.

See also
Communes of the Val-d'Oise department

References

External links
 Official website 
 Pictures Quais de Seine 
 Universite inter-Ages Herblay 

Association of Mayors of the Val d'Oise 

Communes of Val-d'Oise